Güzgülü is a village in the Yedisu District, Bingöl Province, Turkey. The village is populated by Circassians (Abzakh) and by Kurds of the Abdalan, Çarekan, Lolan and Maskan tribes. It had a population of 227 in 2021.

The hamlets of Çaltepe, Çayağzı, Dilek, Doluca, Geyikli, Güleç, Harmanlı, Konuklu, Koyuncular, Kömürlü, Köse and Yurtiçi are attached to the village.

References 

Villages in Yedisu District
Kurdish settlements in Bingöl Province